Marsh Rainbow Arch Bridge may refer to:

Marsh Rainbow Arch Bridge (Lake City, Iowa), listed on the National Register of Historic Places in Calhoun County, Iowa
Marsh Rainbow Arch Bridge (Chippewa Falls, Wisconsin), listed on the National Register of Historic Places in Chippewa County, Wisconsin
Marsh Concrete Rainbow Arch Bridge, in Cambria Township, Blue Earth County, Minnesota
Rainbow Arch Bridge (Valley City, North Dakota), built by Marsh Engineering Company